(DDR), is a music video game, developed by  Konami, released in arcades on September 26, 1998 in Japan. Dance Dance Revolution is a unique game involving dance and rhythm that defined the genre. It involves timing and balance by having players use their feet instead of their hands like typical video games. In March 1999, the game was released for North American arcades, and for European arcades under the name Dancing Stage. Dance Dance Revolution is cited as one of the greatest video games ever made. Players and game critics were caught off-guard by the game's addictive qualities winning the new franchise many merits to its design.

On Saturday, April 10, 1999, Dance Dance Revolution was released for the Japanese PlayStation, adding new music and gameplay elements. A console release was not made for any other region until 2001.

Gameplay
The objective of Dance Dance Revolution is to move one's feet to a set pattern. Players must step to the beat, matching their beat to the arrows presented to them on screen by stepping on arrows on a dance pad. Arrows come from the bottom to the top towards a set of stationary arrows known as the "Step Zone". If they reach it, players step on the pad and the game will then judge the accuracy of the timing, ranging from "Perfect", "Great", "Good", "Boo", to "Miss". An on-screen life meter, known as the Dance Gauge, begins halfway full at the start of each song. Perfect and Great steps slowly fill the Gauge, while Boo and Miss steps quickly deplete it. Good steps have no effect either way. If a player accumulates too many Boos or Misses, and the Dance Gauge becomes empty, the song fails and the game ends. The game also tracks a combo tally from 4 combos upward, which will break if players score Good or lower.

At the end of each song, players see their accumulated points, bonus points, and how many of each kind of step they made. They also get a letter grade that is dependent on the judgments received during play, ranging from SS, all steps Perfect, to E, failure, which is only seen in Couple mode when the other player passes. If players manage to pass all their songs a cumulative results screen is given, totaling the stats from all played stages.

The game offers three different play styles: Single (one player plays on a single dance pad), Couple (two players play with a unified stepchart spread over two separate dance pads), and Double (one player plays on two dance pads, stepcharts are different compared to Single), the last of which requires a step code to be entered. After selecting a play style, players will be prompted to select a game mode out of three: Easy, Normal, and Hard. Normal and Hard are the main bulk of the game and offer different set of songs. Easy, which has the same song selection as Normal, limits players to one stage but enables them to play to the end of the song even if the dance meter is completely depleted.

After choosing a mode, players will be taken to the song selection, which takes the form of a jukebox-like menu of CDs that represent the available songs. On this screen, various step codes can be entered on the dance stage to adjust the game. Single Play offers two different difficulty levels per song. These levels, known as "Basic" and "Another", may be set while selecting play style or by entering step codes during the song selection. Each difficulty is rated on a scale of 1 to 7, each labeled with a name: Simple (1), Average (2), Novice (3), Expert (4), Professional (5), Genuine (6), and Hero (7). Another step code enables the "Mirror" option, which rotates each arrows to their opposite directions. Players may play anywhere from one to five songs, depending on how many the arcade operator sets the machine to play each game. Players start with 6 song options and cannot choose the same song twice within the same credit. If they manage to fill the dance meter to maximum in Final Stage while playing Basic difficulty in Single Play, players will be granted access to Extra Stage, where they may choose another song set to Another difficulty. A new song will also be added, which varies depending on whether players selected Normal or Hard modes.

During gameplay, 3D dancing characters appear in the background of each song. Different characters can be selected at the main title screen by standing on either the left or right arrow panels while pressing the select button.

Internet Ranking Version
An update, titled "Internet Ranking Version" and popularly known as "DDR 1.5", was released on November 18, 1998 and is by far the most common version of the game. As the name suggests, the game's main purpose is to rank scores online. After a playthrough ends, the game gives a code which can be inputted to the official website for high score purposes.

The game also adds two new songs and numerous different changes to the gameplay. A new addition is Versus Play, which requires two credits and a step code to activate. It is a two-player mode, similar to Couple, but rather than playing on a unified stepchart, each player plays their own stepchart, though they still have to select the same difficulty level. Two difficulty levels are added: "Maniac" for Single Play and "Another" for Double Play. It is possible to access Extra Stage by clearing Final Stage on Single Another or Double Basic, which will lead Extra Stage to be played on Single Maniac and Double Another, respectively. The difficulty scale is increased to 8, labeled "Exorbitant", and some of the other labels are renamed; Moderate (2), Ordinary (3), Superior (4), Marvelous (5), and Paramount (7). Finally, arrows now disappear within the Step Zone if players score Perfect or Great (the original version made no distinction regardless of timing), which has since become a staple in the series.

Home version
The home version was released in Japan on Saturday April 10, 1999 for the PlayStation. It includes all 11 songs from the original arcade version along with 5 new songs, three of which are from the arcade version of Dance Dance Revolution 2ndMIX and the rest being console-exclusive songs (which would be added in DDR 2ndMIX Link Version) for a total of 16 songs. It also includes Edit Mode (for editing stepcharts) and Arrange Mode (a mode where if the player step on direction the arrows not meant to appear, they will get a miss).

Sequels

Dance Dance Revolution 2ndMix

It was released as an arcade game by Konami in Japan on January 29, 1999.

It has a total of 32 songs: ten from the original Dance Dance Revolution arcade game and 26 all-new songs. The graphics are mostly retained from the original game, with some changes. The jukebox song list now displays 8 song options instead of 6 and a "Random" option, which if selected will cause a random song to play the next stage. Other than Mirror, many new options can be activated with step codes: Left (shifts the arrow placements to the left), Right (shifts the placement to the right), Shuffle (randomizes the placement), Hidden (arrows disappear when they are about to reach the Step Zone), and Little (eliminates all non-quarter beat steps, which will lessen the maximum score available to attain). Through step codes, two players may also select different difficulty levels while playing in Versus and Couple modes. The game removes Extra Stage and adds Step Battle, a competitive play style in which each player records a series of steps for the other player to play. Step Battle is exclusive to three songs and can only be accessed with codes.

An updated version, Dance Dance Revolution 2ndMix Link Version, was released to Japanese arcades on April 28, 1999. This version came with a PlayStation memory card reader, installed in the middle of the arcade cabinet. It supports cards that have Link Data from the home version of Dance Dance Revolution, allowing each player to save high scores and play custom step edits. 2ndMix Link Version adds five new songs to the game, two from the home version and three new licenses, for a total of 37 songs. The game adds an "All Music" mode, making it the first time players can access the entire song list from the start. Future Dance Dance Revolution releases in Japan, up to and including Dance Dance Revolution Extreme, integrated Link Data functionality in-game. However, these required different home games to produce different Link Data formats: 3rdMix, 4thMix, 4thMix Plus, 5thMix and New Version.

, the home version of 2ndMix, was released in Japan on April 20, 2000, for the Sony PlayStation. It includes 35 songs, 3 of which are new to this version and are hidden and unlockable. Two of the hidden songs were previews of the next arcade version, Dance Dance Revolution 3rdMix and can only be played on Basic difficulty. The home version has the ability to Disc Change to 1st and Append Club Version. It also allows to unlock features in previous mixes such as the Nonstop Ranking from 3rd Mix. The interface is still the same as the one used in 2ndMix.

On April 20, 2000, Konami released a version of Dance Dance Revolution 2ndMix for the Dreamcast console. It features 47 songs, seven of which are hidden and unlockable. The song list includes seven songs from Dance Dance Revolution 3rdMix.

Most of the new songs in 2ndMix (with the exception of "BAD GIRLS", "BOYS", "HERO", "stomp to my beat", and the So-REAL Mix of "MAKE IT BETTER") were included in the North American version of Dance Dance Revolution for the PlayStation.

Dance Dance Revolution 3rdMix
, sometimes abbreviated as 3rdMix, is the third game in the Dance Dance Revolution series of music video games. It was released in Japanese arcades by Konami on Saturday October 30, 1999. The arcade machine is the first to be based on Bemani System 573 Digital. It has a total of 72 songs, 35 of which are new to the arcade series.

Instead of Easy, Medium, and Hard, the mode selection now offers "Soft", "Medium", and "Nonstop". Soft, a replacement of Easy, activates the Little option permanently and only allows one song to be selected. Medium leads to normal gameplay. Nonstop is a new mode in which players select a course which contains 4 songs back-to-back. Couple Style has been replaced by Unison, where two players play a unified stepchart featuring parts where they have to step on the same direction at the same time. Step Battle has also been removed.

Before the game starts, players may toggle game modes using codes to switch between "3rdMix", "2ndMix", and "Step Step Revolution (SSR)". 3rdMix and SSR modes give access to the new songs, but 3rdMix Mode limits players to choose Basic and Another difficulties, while SSR Mode limits access to Maniac, now renamed "SSR". 2ndMix Mode is an updated recreation of DDR 2ndMix, featuring 37 songs in a 3rdMix interface and enables all three difficulties to be selected. The game is the first to add Double Maniac/SSR stepcharts, but these are not available in 2ndMix Mode. The difficulty scale has been further increased to 9, labeled as "Catastrophic".

The game still utilizes the jukebox-style song list but modifies it so that the highlighted song's CD is displayed to the front. Instead of being accessed through codes, players may choose a character through a dedicated screen. The game is the first to differentiate the colors of arrows based on their timing, an option known as "Vivid". Vivid is turned on by default in 3rdMix and 2ndMix Modes, but must be enabled with a code in SSR Mode, as "Flat" (all arrows are the same color; the previous arrow option) is turned on by default instead. Other new options added include Sudden (arrows appear midway through while rising up towards the Step Zone, a reverse of Hidden) and Stealth (arrows are invisible, requiring memorization)

3rdMix was reissued as Dance Dance Revolution 3rdMix Plus on June 21, 2000. This title, exclusive to Japan, adds 17 songs: three new DanceMania licenses, seven K-Pop tracks from VER.KOREA and seven Konami Originals. Two of these Konami Originals made their arcade premiere in Dancing Stage EuroMix. SSR Mode is removed and its Maniac stepcharts are folded back to 3rdMix Mode. New content for Plus is selectable in "3rdMix Plus Mode" separate from 3rdMix Mode.

Different versions of Dance Dance Revolution 3rdMix were released for other countries in Asia. The first release in 1999 removed four new songs, made "Strictly Business" unavailable outside of 2ndMix mode and had a bug when trying to enter the Shuffle modification. Two versions of the game were later released exclusively in South Korea: VER.KOREA on April 1, 2000 and VER.KOREA2 on May 1, 2000. VER.KOREA features the same song changes found in the Asia version, but fixes the Shuffle bug and adds seven new Korean pop songs in 3rdMix and SSR modes.  VER.KOREA2 is identical to VER.KOREA, but adds 9 more K-Pop songs.

International variants include Dancing Stage EuroMix and Dance Dance Revolution USA. EuroMix was released in European arcades on August 2000. It has a reduced song list of 28 songs, half which are Konami Originals and half which are licenses. Of the licenses, eight are from Universal Music Group and are only available in this arcade release. Six Konami Originals can be added by activating Internet Ranking, for a total of 34 songs. USA was released in North American arcades in October 2000. It has a reduced song list of 26 songs: six licenses and 20 Konami Originals. EuroMix with Internet Ranking and USA share four licenses and 15 Konami Originals in common, including two 3rdMix Plus tracks: "Love This Feelin'" and "TRIP MACHINE ～luv mix～".

In 2004, Dance Dance Revolution 3rdMix was inducted into GameSpot's list of the greatest games of all time.

Dance Dance Revolution 4thMix

It was released as an arcade game by Konami on August 24, 2000. 4thMix features 136 songs, 49 of which are new to this mix. Twelve of the songs are initially hidden and must be unlocked by the arcade operator.

Many parts of the interface are overhauled. Instead of codes being used to select play style, there is a dedicated Play Style selection in which players can select between Single, Versus, Double, or Nonstop. Players then select one out of eight different categories in which the song list has been divided, each also featuring a different character. Instead of a jukebox, the song list is now presented in seven diagonal banners visible at any time. Scrolling past the rightmost or leftmost banner will bring another seven banners. After choosing a song, players will be prompted to select a difficulty level, instead of having to input step codes to toggle it. "Another" is renamed to "Trick" and the level is no longer indicated by a label. Double Maniac stepchart has been added for songs lacking it in the previous game. Finally, in Versus Play, players can access "Battle" stepcharts from the difficulty selection, which replaces Unison Mode. In Battle, arrows come from a single lane at the bottom before going to either the 1st or 2nd Player.

The game was reissued as Dance Dance Revolution 4thMix Plus on December 28, 2000. Like 3rdMix Plus, it is an upgraded version, adding 14 new songs, adding to 150 songs in total. An All Music category is added, enabling players to access the entire song list from the start. Some songs have new Maniac stepcharts, while their old Maniac charts from the original game are recategorized as "Maniac-S" (for Single) or "Maniac-D" (for Double). There is also a DDR Solo version of this mix, which offers 4-step and 6-step modes in a DDR Solo cabinet.

Dance Dance Revolution 5thMix

Dance Dance Revolution 5thMIX, or DDR 5th Mix, is the 5th game in the Dance Dance Revolution series of music video games. It was released to the arcades by Konami on March 27, 2001. Although only officially released in Japan, units exist worldwide. DDR 5th Mix contains a total of 122 songs, nine of which are hidden and unlockable. Of those songs, 40 of them (including all nine unlockable songs) are brand new to Dance Dance Revolution.

The game runs on 60 frame rate instead of 30, the first mainline DDR game to do this (Dancing Stage featuring True Kiss Destination was the first). The song selection interface is changed once more to become wheel-like, with song titles displayed on the right in rectangular boxes and the highlighted song's banner, difficulty, and BPM displayed on the left. This so-called "song wheel" interface would become a mainstay for many DDR games in the future. Difficulty level is once again selected by pressing on the step panels, instead of being selected in a dedicated menu. The game is also the first to introduce AAA grade, as previous games only went up to AA. Both Nonstop and Battle Modes have been removed, while songs with new Maniac charts introduced in 4thMix Plus have their old Maniac charts removed. Categories has also been removed, though characters are still selected through a dedicated menu after Play Style. Finally, the game is one of the few to include long version of certain songs, which take up two whole stages and as a result cannot be selected in Final Stage.

DDRMAX, DDRMAX2 and DDR Extreme

Current Dance Dance Revolution releases

Dance Dance Revolution A was released on March 30, 2016 in Asia, with a North American release later in 2016, and a European release on December 15, 2017. It is the first international arcade release of Dance Dance Revolution since Dance Dance Revolution X2.

Dance Dance Revolution A20 was released on new, golden cabinets on March 20, 2019, and a United States release imported later on May 15, 2019.

Music

The following lists the tracklists featured in Dance Dance Revolution 3rdMix, Dance Dance Revolution 4thMix, and Dance Dance Revolution 5thMix. Unless noted, successive arcade games feature all songs featured in the preceding arcade games. For more information about the tracklists of the first two games, refer to the two links above. Note that 4thMix received two console ports; the second port, Dance Dance Revolution Extra Mix, essentially doubles as a console port of the Dance Dance Revolution Solo spin-off series by including nearly all of their songs, both licensed and Konami Original, plus tracks added in 4thMix Plus as well as new tracks.

The original soundtracks for all the arcade games up to Dance Dance Revolution Extreme were produced by Toshiba EMI under their Dancemania dance music brand. They also feature second Nonstop Megamix discs with the various songs in the games mixed together in succession. 

  indicates that the songs need to be unlocked.
 Bold indicates long versions.

Reception

In Japan, Game Machine listed Dance Dance Revolution on their December 1, 1998 issue as being the most-successful dedicated arcade game of the month. Along with its 2ndMix update, Dance Dance Revolution became the highest-grossing dedicated arcade game of 1999 in Japan. The game sold over 10,000 arcade cabinets by 1999.

The PlayStation version sold  units in Japan and  units in the United States, for a combined 1,405,048 units sold.

Blake Fischer reviewed the PlayStation version of the game for Next Generation, rating it four stars out of five, and stated that "If you're looking for a fresh new experience with your PlayStation that's tons of fun and will make you the life of the party, this is your game. Just expect a rough learning curve."

On release, Famitsu magazine scored the PlayStation version of the game a 31 out of 40, and the Dreamcast version a 30 out of 40.

On release, Famitsu magazine scored the game a 34 out of 40. The successful DDR series began with the 1998/1999 release of this game, and its popularity can be attributed to the innovative connection between a dancing stage and the need for the player to move their body to match the instructions on the screen.

In 2022, The Strong National Museum of Play inducted Dance Dance Revolution to its World Video Game Hall of Fame.

References

External links
Dance Dance Revolution official website 
Dancemania 

1998 video games
Arcade video games
Dance Dance Revolution games
PlayStation (console) games
Video games developed in Japan
World Video Game Hall of Fame